The Colisée Financière Sun Life (in English, Sun Life Financial Coliseum)  is a 4,285-seat (total capacity 5,062) multi-purpose arena in Rimouski, Quebec, Canada, built in 1966. It is home to the Rimouski Océanic ice hockey team, and the arena hosted the 2009 Memorial Cup.

Gallery

References

Indoor ice hockey venues in Quebec
Indoor arenas in Quebec
Sports venues in Quebec
Quebec Major Junior Hockey League arenas
Buildings and structures in Rimouski
Sport in Rimouski
Sports venues completed in 1966
1966 establishments in Quebec